"My two cents" ("my 2¢") and its longer version "put my two cents in" is an American idiomatic expression, taken from the original English idiom "to put in my two-penny worth".

Origin
The earliest reference to an analogue of "two cents/pence" appears in the lesson of the widow's mite from both the Gospel of Mark and the Gospel of Luke. In the biblical episode, several wealthy temple patrons donate large sums of money, while a poor widow places just two small coins into the offering. She finds greater favour with Jesus than the wealthy patrons however, as the two coins constitute her whole wealth, as opposed to a tiny fraction from the rich merchants of theirs.

A possible origin may be from boxing in Nottingham during the 1900s. Jack Jetlamey, a well-known gambler despite the little money he had, was always willing to bet on Jack Johnson, a new hopeful boxer. Jetlamey was known to say "two, two, two my two cents in for Johnson", making the whole audience laugh at every match.

Other likely origins are that "my two pennies worth" is derived from the much older 16th-century English expression, "a penny for your thoughts", possibly a sarcastic response to receiving more opinion than was wanted "I said a penny for your thoughts, but I got two pennies' worth". There is also some belief that the idiom may have its origins in the early cost of postage in England, the "twopenny post", where two pennies was the normal charge of sending a letter containing one's words and thoughts or feelings to someone.

Usage 

The expression is used to preface a tentative statement of one’s opinion. By deprecating the opinion to follow—suggesting its value is only two cents, a very small amount—the user of the phrase, showing politeness and humility, hopes to lessen the impact of a possibly contentious statement.

The expression is also sometimes used to preface uncontentious opinions. For example, "If I may put my two cents in, that hat doesn't do you any favors" (a polite way of saying, for example, "that hat is ugly"). Another example would be "My two cents is that you should sell your stock now."

"Two cents" and its variations may also be used in place of the noun  "opinion" or the verb phrase "state [subject's] opinion", e.g. "You had to put your two cents in, didn't you?" or "But that’s just my two cents."

This expression is also often used as a supplementary phrase after a statement, e.g. "Just my two cents."

See also

IMO
Penny-related idiomatic expressions

References

American English idioms